Club Bàsquet Inca was a professional basketball team based in Inca, Balearic Islands.

Bàsquet Inca played during several seasons in the LEB Oro, Spanish second division, until it merged in 2008 with Bàsquet Muro in the new Bàsquet Mallorca.

Season by season

See also
Bàsquet Mallorca

Notes and references

External links
Federación Española de Baloncesto
Fundación Basquetinca.com Official Page

Defunct basketball teams in Spain
Basketball teams established in 1987
Basketball teams in the Balearic Islands
Inca, Spain
Former LEB Oro teams
Former Liga EBA teams
Former LEB Plata teams
Basketball teams disestablished in 2008
Sport in Mallorca